Mirko Đermanović (also transliterated Mirko Djermanović; born 2 January 1995) is a Serbian football defender, who plays for Budućnost Krušik.

Club career
Born in Belgrade, Đermanović came throw the BSK Borča youth academy. He made his first senior appearances with Železničar Lajkovac in the Serbian League West. After he spent the whole 2015 with Budućnost Krušik 2014, Đermanović signed with Mačva Šabac in 2016. Playing with Mačva, Đermanović won the Serbian League West and Serbian First League. In summer 2017, Đermanović returned to Budućnost Krušik 2014.

Career statistics

Honours
Mačva Šabac
Serbian League West: 2015–16
Serbian First League: 2016–17

References

External links
 

1995 births
Living people
Footballers from Belgrade
Association football fullbacks
Serbian footballers
FK BSK Borča players
FK Železničar Lajkovac players
FK Budućnost Valjevo players
FK Mačva Šabac players
Serbian First League players